Olivier Bériot (born 30 November 1962) is a French costume designer.

He received César Award nominations for Best Costumes in 2011 for The Extraordinary Adventures of Adèle Blanc-Sec and in 2014 for Me, Myself and Mum.

References

Living people
1962 births
French costume designers
César Award winners